Four vessels of the United States Navy have been named USS Louisville, after the city of Louisville, Kentucky:
, was an ironclad steamboat used during the American Civil War
, was the steamship St. Louis renamed and used in 1918 as a troop transport
, was a heavy cruiser commissioned in 1931 and active in World War II
, is a  nuclear attack submarine commissioned in 1986 and decommissioned in March 2021

See also
Louisville (disambiguation)

United States Navy ship names
History of Louisville, Kentucky